Harry Edward Sauthoff (June 3, 1879 – June 16, 1966) was an American teacher, coach, lawyer and politician from Madison, Wisconsin. The son of a German immigrant, Sauthoff was a 1909 graduate of the University of Wisconsin Law School. He held many political offices including being elected to the United States House of Representatives.

Early life
Harry Sauthoff was born on June 3, 1879, in Madison, Wisconsin. Sauthoff was the son of August and Hermine Sauthoff. Both his parents were German immigrants from the province of Hanover.  He graduated from the University of Wisconsin–Madison in 1902. After his undergraduate education he taught and coached for Lake Geneva High School from 1902 to 1905 and Northern Illinois University from 1905 to 1906. He served as the head football coach at Northern Illinois University in 1905, compiling a record of 3–1–1. Sauthoff was also the head basketball coach at Northern Illinois for one season in 1905–06. He returned to University of Wisconsin to study law and graduated in 1909.

Political career
Sauthoff served as district attorney of Dane County, Wisconsin from 1915 to 1919. In 1921 Sauthoff served as Secretary to Governor John J. Blaine. He served as a delegate to the International Conference on the St. Lawrence Deep Waterway and the Mississippi Valley Conference on Mississippi River Improvement in 1921.

Sauthoff served in the Wisconsin State Senate from 1925 to 1929. In 1934 he was elected as a Progressive to the United States House of Representatives, representing Wisconsin's 2nd congressional district. He served from January 3, 1935 to January 3, 1939 as part of the 74th and 75th United States Congresses. He lost his reelection bid in the 1938 election. He ran again in 1940 and won, serving from January 3, 1941 to January 3, 1945 as part of the 77th and 78th Congresses. He was defeated in the 1944 election for the United States Senate, receiving 5.8 percent of the vote as a third-party candidate.

Sauthoff resumed practicing law until his retirement in 1955.

Personal life
Sauthoff died on June 16, 1966, in Madison. He was buried at Forest Hill Cemetery in Madison.

Head coaching record

Football

References

External links
 
 

1879 births
1966 deaths
Members of the United States House of Representatives from Wisconsin
Northern Illinois Huskies football coaches
Northern Illinois Huskies men's basketball coaches
Progressive Party (1924) members of the United States House of Representatives
20th-century American politicians
Wisconsin Progressives (1924)
Wisconsin state senators
University of Wisconsin–Madison alumni
University of Wisconsin Law School alumni
Sportspeople from Madison, Wisconsin
American people of German descent
Basketball coaches from Wisconsin